Blayney could refer to:

Places
 Blayney, New South Wales, Australia, a small town
 Blayney, Ontario, Canada, a farming hamlet

People
 Blaney (surname), includes Blayney
 Blayney Townley (Dunleer MP), MP (1692–1715) for Dunleer (Parliament of Ireland constituency) 
 Blayney Townley-Balfour (Carlingford MP) (1705–1788)

Other uses
 Baron Blayney, an extinct title in the Peerage of Ireland